
Gmina Czernica is a rural gmina (administrative district) in Wrocław County, Lower Silesian Voivodeship, in south-western Poland. It is part of the Wrocław metropolitan area.

Neighbouring gminas
Gmina Czernica is bordered by the city of Wrocław and by the gminas of Bierutów, Długołęka, Jelcz-Laskowice, Oława, Oleśnica and Siechnice.

Villages
The gmina contains the villages of Chrząstawa Mała, Chrząstawa Wielka, Czernica, Dobrzykowice, Gajków, Jeszkowice, Kamieniec Wrocławski, Krzyków, Łany, Nadolice Małe, Nadolice Wielkie, Ratowice and Wojnowice.

References

Czernica
Wrocław County